is a Japanese manga series written and illustrated by Kintetsu Yamada. It was serialized in Kodansha's digital seinen manga magazine D Morning from June 2018 to August 2019, and later in Morning from October 2019 to January 2021, with its chapters collected in tankōbon volumes. A nine-episode television drama adaptation was broadcast on MBS from February to April 2022.

Plot
Asako Yaeshima is a timid office worker at Lilia Drop, a toiletry company. Asako loves the company, because she is ashamed about her sweating problems and body odor, and the scent of the soap produced by the company is the only thing capable of undermining her insecurities. However, when Kotaro Natori, the company’s lead product developer, approaches her and gets a deep whiff, he states that he loves Asako's smell and finds her inspirational. As the two continue to meet for work, Asako begins to care less about being sniffed by Kotaro, and they start a romantic relationship.

Characters

Korisu Ichise

Keita Yaeshima

Yūji Suzumura

Maki Sakashita

Osamu Hashitani

Jin Ōkura

Media

Manga
It was later published as a full-fledged serialized manga in the same magazine from June 21, 2018, to August 22, 2019. The series was then transferred to Morning, being serialized from October 3, 2019, to January 7, 2021. Kodansha collected its chapters in eleven tankōbon volumes, released from October 10, 2018, to May 21, 2021.

In North America, Kodansha USA announced the English language release of the manga in July 2019. The eleven volumes were published from February 25, 2020, to December 14, 2021.

After the serialization, Yamada published a 24-page doujinshi titled Kodomo Tsukuru Hon ("A Book of Making a Baby") in Comitia 136 in June 2021. The story is about Asako and Kotaro having sex without contraception for the first time.

Volume list

Drama
In January 2022, it was announced that the series would receive a television drama adaptation, which was broascast on MBS's Drama Tokku programming block from February 4 to April 1 of the same year.

Reception
Sweat and Soap placed #2 in the 3rd annual Tsutaya Comic Awards in 2019. 
The series also placed 9th in the 5th Next Manga Awards in the digital category. Alongside Dr. Stone and Heterogenia Linguistico, the series ranked #17 on Takarajimasha's Kono Manga ga Sugoi! list of best manga of 2020 for male readers.  It ranked #6 on "Nationwide Bookstore Employees' Recommended Comics of 2020" by the Honya Club online bookstore. The manga was nominated for the 45th Kodansha Manga Award in the general category in 2021.

Rebecca Silverman from Anime News Network wrote that while the "sniff-based" romance is a "bit awkward" or "uncomfortable", it is "worth giving this a chance anyway", adding: "it's easy to get behind Asako and Natori and in romance, that's often the most important thing." Brittany Vincent from Otaku USA called the main characters' relationship "downright enviable", and wrote that the story is "unique and moves along at a good clip." Demelza from Anime UK News wrote that despite a premise "somewhat creepy and off-putting", she "wasn’t expecting such a sweet romance series", calling the "wholesome content of the story" a "compelling and heartwarming read", concluding: "If you’re looking for a sweet love story involving adult characters then certainly give this one a go!."

Notes

References

External links
  
  
 

Kodansha manga
Mainichi Broadcasting System original programming
Romantic comedy anime and manga
Seinen manga
Slice of life anime and manga